Indonesia Calling is a 1946 Australian short documentary film directed by Joris Ivens and produced by the Waterside Workers' Federation. The film depicts post-World War II Sydney as trade union seamen and waterside workers refuse to service Dutch ships (known as the "Black Armada") containing arms and ammunition destined for Indonesia to suppress the country's independence movement. Ivens filming of the events taking place gradually became a symbol even for those who had not seen the film and had a growing following in the Netherlands, long before the film had an audience.

Joris Ivens suffered persecution for his stance about the Dutch and Indonesia. Ivens had his Dutch passport seized by Dutch authorities for a few months at a time in order to monitor his whereabouts.

In 1985, the Dutch government presented Ivens with a Golden Calf. At the ceremony, the Dutch minister gave a speech and in his words, "Shortly after the war, your support for Indonesia's right to self-determination and your film Indonesia Calling brought you into conflict with the Dutch government […] I can now say that history has come down more on your side than on the side of your adversaries."

See also
Cinema of Indonesia
Calling Australia
Netherlands Indies Government Information Service
South Pacific Film Corporation

References

Hans Schoots, Living Dangerously: A Biography of Joris Ivens (Amsterdam: Amsterdam University Press, 2000)

External links

 sensesofcinema.com: From Colonial Film Commissioner to Political Pariah: Joris Ivens and the Making of Indonesia Calling by Drew Cottle and Angela Keys
'Indonesia Calling: Joris Ivens In Australia', ABC Arts, Friday 3 December, 2010
 Indonesia Calling at National Film and Sound Archive
Ivens.nl 'Indonesia Calling', The Legacy of Joris Ivens
'Joris Ivens' historic short film: Indonesia Calling' Jakarta Post, 16 August 2009
Indonesia Calling at Oz Movies

1946 documentary films
Black-and-white documentary films
1946 films
Australian short documentary films
1946 short films
Films directed by Joris Ivens
Films about the Indonesian National Revolution
1940s short documentary films
Films shot in Sydney
Documentary films about Indonesia
Australian black-and-white films
1940s English-language films
1940s Australian films